The Amite River  is a tributary of Lake Maurepas in Mississippi and Louisiana in the United States. It starts as two forks in southwestern Mississippi and flows south through Louisiana, passing Greater Baton Rouge, to Lake Maurepas. The lower  of the river is navigable. A portion of the river is diverted via the Petite Amite River and Amite Diversion Canal to the Blind River, which also flows to Lake Maurepas.

Name
Amite could be an name derived from the Choctaw language meaning "young", although folk etymology holds it to be a corruption of the French amitié meaning "friendship".

Gallery

See also
2016 Louisiana floods
List of Louisiana rivers
List of rivers of Mississippi

References

External links
Amite River Basin Commission
 Excerpt about Amité River from The Free State - A History and Place-Names Study of Livingston Parish, US Genweb
Columbia Gazetteer of North America, Bartleby website

Rivers of Louisiana
Bodies of water of East Baton Rouge Parish, Louisiana
Bodies of water of East Feliciana Parish, Louisiana
Bodies of water of St. Helena Parish, Louisiana
Rivers of Ascension Parish, Louisiana
Bodies of water of Livingston Parish, Louisiana
Landforms of Amite County, Mississippi
Rivers of Mississippi
Landforms of Lincoln County, Mississippi
Tributaries of Lake Maurepas
Mississippi placenames of Native American origin
Louisiana placenames of Native American origin